Vanessa Marshall (born October 19, 1969 in Los Angeles, California, U.S.) is an American voice and television actress who is most active in films, cartoons and video games. She is the daughter of actress Joan Van Ark and reporter John Marshall.

Career 
Prior to her career as a voice actor, Marshall attended Princeton University, majoring in English. She then attended graduate school at the New York University Tisch School of the Arts, attaining a masters in acting and learning different dialects, which Marshall credits for helping her in her voiceover career. She started voice acting after being discovered by a voice acting agent during a solo performance, where she was playing 15 different characters. One of her best known roles is her voice acting for the character Hera Syndulla in Star Wars Rebels. She reprised the role in Star Wars: The Bad Batch. 

In July 2021, Marshall described Hera as a "strong, iconic female character", said that she brought together all the elements in her life into her voice acting as Hera, and argued that Hera became inspirational for her. Previously, she stated, in a April 2016 interview, that she brought her "convictions and...open heart" to each session in which she recorded as Hera, including her study of martial arts, and said the original Star Wars film in 1977 had a " huge impact" on her. In another interview, in March 2016, said she "secretly dedicated" her performance as Hera to her father, who is a pilot, noted her use of French language skills in the show, and joked that Sabine Wren was her "favorite character" in Rebels.

Personal life 
Marshall was married to voice-over artist and rapper Andrew Kishino from 2001 to 2007. During their marriage, they founded Marsh-Kish Productions, a voice-over production company; she decided to keep the company name as the two remained "the best of friends" after their divorce. Both have appeared as main characters in The Spectacular Spider-Man. Her acting in this has been compared to that of her mother in the 1970s Spider-Woman series.

Filmography

Voice acting

Animation

Films

Video games

AudioBooks

Live-action

References

External links 
 Official Website
 
Vanessa Marshall's Official Facebook fan page

Living people
Actresses from New York City
American people of Dutch descent
American television actresses
American video game actresses
American voice actresses
New York University alumni
Place of birth missing (living people)
Princeton University alumni
20th-century American actresses
21st-century American actresses
1969 births